is a Japanese screenwriter.

Watanabe is a member of the Scenario Writers Association. Her husband is freelance announcer Shinichi Hatori.

Biography
She was born in Tokyo.

In 2000, she worked for a company as an office lady, originally thought that she wanted to write something, because she liked her books originally, as a result of the screenplay version of the television drama Fuzoroi no Ringo-tachi taken from a bookstore she am was willing for her path of screenwriting. In the era of underwriting worked on plotting screenplay and stayed in the eyes of producers of television stations, she made her debut as a screenwriter at the 2002 TV drama Tentai Kansoku (Kansai Telecasting Corporation).

Since then, she has worked numerous comedies and romantic dramas around television dramas. In 2010 one of her works Nakanai to Kimeta Hi (Fuji Television) drew attention by hiding the back and front of the human with the theme of female workplace bullying without hiding, attracting attention, and in 2014 First Class (Fuji Television) drew a female rating "Mounting" and called a topic. She was highly appraised as writing a plurality of characters as a single story and received a reputation that she "felt refined elegance" and received a screenplay of the Asadora Beppinsan in the latter half of 2016.

In her private life, she was married on 18 August 2014, after acquiring a dinner hosted by President TakeOff in August 2012, after a dating period of about two years with a freelance announcer Shinichi Hatori belonging to the same office since around November the same year. On 13 January 2016 Asadora Beppinsan made a preliminary announcement at the production presentation, giving birth to a girl who becomes her first child at the end of the same month.

Works

TV dramas

Films

Internet dramas

Internet

Stage

References

Notes

Sources

External links
NHK Matsuyama Broadcasting Bureau: Premium Drama Aruku, Aruku, Aruku: Shikoku Henro Michi Author: Chiho Watanabe 
 (16–22 Nov 2009) 

Japanese women screenwriters
People from Tokyo
1972 births
Living people